Arthur Pincott (3 March 1877 – 23 June 1935) was an Australian rules footballer who played for the Geelong Football Club in the Victorian Football League (VFL).
Originally from Geelong & District Football League (GDFL) club Newtown, Pincott made his VFL debut in 1897, the league's first season, and played 72 matches, for no goals by the end of the 1903 VFL season.

Pincott died aged 58 in Jindivick, Victoria.

Notes

External links 
		

1877 births
1935 deaths
Australian rules footballers from Victoria (Australia)
Geelong Football Club players
Newtown Football Club players